Biscay is a province of Spain and a historical territory of the Basque Country.

Biscay may also refer to:

Places
 Bay of Biscay, a gulf on the Atlantic coast of France and Spain
Biscay, a sea area in the BBC Shipping Forecast
 Biscay Bay, Newfoundland and Labrador, Canada
 Biscay, Minnesota, a city in the United States
 Biscayarfonna, a glacier in Svalbard, Norway

Other uses
 Biscay (horse) (fl. from 1965), Australian thoroughbred racehorse

See also
Vizcaya (disambiguation)
Biscayne (disambiguation)
Lordship of Biscay c. 1040 to 1876
Biscaya, a song and album by James Last
Bizcaya (football team), was an association football team from Bilbao, Spain